Playground for Life is the second studio album by Irish hard rock band Glyder.

Track listing
All tracks written by Cullen/Kinane/Fisher/Ryan

"Gambler's Blues" - 4:57
"Sweets" - 3:30
"Puppet Queen" - 3:48
"Playground for Life" - 4:34
"For Your Skin" - 4:19
"Walking My Own Ground" - 3:24
"Dark Meets Light" - 3:49
"Sleeping Gun" - 3:23
"Over and Over" - 3:38
"The Merrygoround" - 4:37

Personnel
Tony Cullen - Lead Vocals; Bass Guitars
Bat Kinane - Lead/Rhythm Guitars; Backing Vocals
Peter Fisher - Lead/Rhythm Guitars
Davy Ryan - Drums
Alwyn Walker - Producer, Slide Guitars (Track 10); Keyboards (3,4,7 and 9)
Chris Tsangarides - Keyboards (5,8 and 10)

References 

2008 albums
Glyder (band) albums